WADU may refer to:

KGLA (AM), a radio station (830 AM) licensed to Norco, Louisiana, which held the call sign WADU from 1985 to 1996
WGUO, a radio station (94.9 FM) licensed to Reserve, Louisiana, which held the call sign WADU-FM from 1991 to 2000
Wudu, an Islamic ablution